Bob Harvey may refer to:

 Bob Harvey (mayor) (born 1942), former mayor of Waitakere City, New Zealand
 Bob Harvey (musician) (born 1933), former member of the band Jefferson Airplane
 Bob Harvey (baseball) (1918–1992), American outfielder in Negro league baseball
 Bob Harvey, the captain of the pirate ship the Speedy in Jules Verne's The Mysterious Island

See also
 Robert Harvey (disambiguation)
 Bob Harvie (died 2010), radio announcer